Escalator etiquette is the etiquette of using escalators. In many places, there is a convention that people should stand on a particular side to allow other people to walk on the other side. Standing on the right is the most common convention, following early escalator design in London. In the 21st century, there have been campaigns for standing on both sides for reasons of safety or to increase capacity.

Left, right or both
The first escalators installed in the London Underground at Earl's Court station used the design patented by Charles Seeberger. These did not let the passengers dismount in the direction of travel, as currently. 
Instead, a diagonal partition shunted them off to one side while the stairs disappeared under the partition. The side chosen for disembarkation was the left hand side and this is the origin of their convention that riders should stand on the right, so that the walking riders would not have to cut into a standing line of people to exit.

Other locations, such as Hong Kong follow the London convention of standing on the right but, in some places such as Australia, riders stand on the left and walk on the right.

A 2015 experiment by Transport for London suggested that such a convention sometimes reduces the efficiency of escalators: the number of people carried can increase if people stand on both sides. In Japan, where different cities have different conventions, there was a "No Walk" campaign in 2015. This suggested remaining stationary on both sides for safety reasons and also recommended that riders leave an empty step between themselves and the person in front. Other places that have tried to dissuade riders from walking on escalators include Hong Kong, Toronto and Washington, DC but these campaigns are usually unsuccessful.

Gallery

See also
 Left- and right-hand traffic

References

Citations

Sources

Etiquette
Etiquette